Blues Everywhere is a live album by Shirley Scott recorded in 1991 at Birdland and released on the Candid label.

Reception

Allmusic awarded the album 4 stars with reviewer, Michael Erlewine, stating "The twist is that Scott is playing acoustic piano throughout. It's not the usual sound, but she can play that thing".

Track listing 
All compositions by Shirley Scott except as indicated
 "Autumn Leaves" (Joseph Kosma, Johnny Mercer, Jacques Prévert) - 6:16     
 "Blues Everywhere" - 9:09     
 "Oasis" - 8:41     
 "Embraceable You"  (George Gershwin, Ira Gershwin) - 9:16     
 "Triste" (Antônio Carlos Jobim) - 8:55     
 "'Round Midnight" (Thelonious Monk) - 8:58     
 "The Theme" (Miles Davis) - 6:06

Personnel 
 Shirley Scott - piano
 Arthur Harper - bass 
 Mickey Roker - drums

References 

1991 live albums
Candid Records live albums
Shirley Scott live albums